Michelle Munits (born 2007) is an Israeli rhythmic gymnast. She is the 2022 European junior ball champion.

Personal life 
Her twin Daniela is also a gymnast and won gold with ribbon at the European Championships in 2022.

Career 
Michelle competed at the 2021 Irina Deleanu Cup, finishing 16th in the All-Around, 10th with hoop, 15th with ball, 42nd with clubs and 6th with ribbon.

International tournament in Sofia, she was 32nd with ball, 6th with clubs. In June she competed with ball at the European Championships in Tel Aviv along her twin, Alona Tal Franco, Lian Rona, the senior group and the individuals Daria Atamanov and Adi Asya Katz, where she won gold in teams and in the apparatus final. On November 26 she took part II edition of the international gala Viravolta-Jael in Santiago de Compostela.

Routine music information

References 

2007 births
Living people
Israeli rhythmic gymnasts
Medalists at the Rhythmic Gymnastics European Championships